Hemibidessus is a genus of beetles in the family Dytiscidae, containing the following species:

 Hemibidessus bifasciatus (Zimmermann, 1921)
 Hemibidessus celinoides (Zimmermann, 1921)
 Hemibidessus conicus (Zimmermann, 1921)
 Hemibidessus plaumanni Gschwendtner, 1935
 Hemibidessus spangleri K.B.Miller, 2002
 Hemibidessus spiroductus K.B.Miller, 2002

References

Dytiscidae